Phantoma may refer to:

 Phantoma, a disused synonym for the manitid genus Empusa
 Fantomah, a comic book superheroine
 Phantoma, an Australian dub name for Ōgon Bat, a 1931 Japanese paper theater superhero